This is a list of the oldest buildings and structures in Toronto, that were constructed before 1920. The history of Toronto dates back to Indigenous settlements in the region approximately 12,000 years ago. However, the oldest standing structures in Toronto were built by European settlers. Remains of a Seneca settlement exist at the federally protected Bead Hill archaeological site, in eastern Toronto.

The first European structure built in Toronto was Magasin Royal, a French trading post established in 1720. In the 1750s, the French built several structures in the area (including Fort Rouillé), although the French would later destroy them in 1759, following their defeat at the Battle of Fort Niagara. In 1793, the government of Upper Canada arranged for the purchase of Toronto from the Mississaugas in order to settle newly landed British American colonists Loyalists, who were exiled from the United States of America after the Revolutionary War. Many of Toronto's oldest structures dates back to this early period of British settlement, when it was known as York. The town of York was formally incorporated as the City of Toronto in 1834, with the passage of the Incorporation of the City of Toronto Act.

This list is composed of buildings that are heritage-designated structures or are notable in some way. Toronto has many residential and business buildings from prior to 1920 that are not on this list. These are typically found in the then-inner suburbs built in the late 1800s to before 1920, such as Cabbagetown, North Toronto, Parkdale and Rosedale.

Surviving structures

The oldest intact structure of European settlement may be a piece of St Paul's Cathedral's courtyard railing dating from 1714, designed by Christopher Wren, that is now part of John Howard's tomb in High Park. Howard had it shipped from London in 1875.

The following list does not include structures where only the facade of the building has been preserved.

1794 to 1819
The surviving structures were often moved from the original site years after; they are mostly residential or military structures.

1820 to 1839

1840 to 1849

1850 to 1859

1860 to 1869

1870 to 1879

1880 to 1889

1890 to 1899

1900 to 1909

1910 to 1919

See also

 List of historic places in Toronto
 List of lost buildings and structures in Toronto
 List of oldest buildings in Canada
 Toronto landmarks

Notes

References

Sources
 W: Other pages within Wikipedia
 1: 
 2: waynecook.com
 3: Etobicoke Historical Society
 4: 
 6: 
 7: 
 8: Cruikshank 2003
 9: McHugh 1989
 10: Toronto District School Board
 11: 
 12: 
 13: History of Thistletown
 14: Toronto Neighbourhoods
 15: Toronto Heritage List of Properties (merged into #6)
 16: Estates of Sunnybrook
 17: Toronto Fire Pics
 18: 
 19: St. George's on-the-Hill Website, History Page
 20: 
 21: 

Bibliography
 "Architecture in Canada" The Canadian Encyclopedia
 
 Denby & Kilbourn, Toronto Observed: Its Architecture, Patrons, and History, Oxford University Press, Toronto 1986
 
 
 
 Maitland, Hucker & Ricketts, A Guide to Canadian Architectural Styles, Broadview Press, Peterborough, Ontario 1992

External links
 Biographical Dictionary of Architects in Canada  – biographies of Canadian architects and lists of their buildings from 1800 to 1950.
 The Former Lakeshore Psychiatric Hospital
 Colborne Lodge and buildings associated with surveyor John Howard
 TO Built
 University of Toronto Capital Projects

Oldest buildings and structures
Toronto
National Historic Sites in Ontario
Buildings and structures